The 47th edition of the Vuelta a Colombia was held from April 21 to May 4, 1997. There were a total of 119 competitors, including six Mexican riders.

Stages

1997-04-21: Bucaramanga — Bucaramanga (7.6 km)

1997-04-22: Bucaramanga — Barichara (148.7 km)

1997-04-23: Oiba — Duitama (192.7 km)

1997-04-24: Tunja — Zipaquirá (138.3 km)

1997-04-25: Funza — Ibagué (196.2 km)

1997-04-26: Ibagué — Sevilla (185.9 km)

1997-04-27: Cali Circuito Panamericano (105 km)

1997-04-28: Palmira — Pereira (200.4 km)

1997-04-29: Santa Rosa de Cabal — Manizales (35.7 km)

1997-04-30: Manizales — Itagüí (184 km)

1997-05-01: Medellín — Alto Santa Helena (91.2 km)

1997-05-02: Rionegro — Puerto Salgar (197 km)

1997-05-03: La Dorada — Fontibón (179.5 km)

1997-05-04: Circuito Bogotá (100 km)

Jersey progression

Final classification

Teams 

Todos por Boyacá — Lotería de Boyacá

Telecom Discado Directo Internacional — Kelme

Kelme Costa Blanca

Aguardiente Antioqueño — Lotería de Medellín

Petróleos de Colombia — Energía Pura

Gaseosas Glacial

Caprecom — Zapatos Kioo’s

San Andresitos de la 38 — Cúcuta su Bono

Ciclistas de Jesucristo

Idea — SAM (Orgullo Paisa)

Mixto Telecom — Oriente Antioqueño

Hotel Nuevo Magdalena Cicloases

Mixto Glacial A

Gaseosas Glacial — Tenis Karst Musher México Guanajuato

See also 
 1997 Clásico RCN

References 
 cyclingnews
 pedalesybielas via webcitation.org, Archived 2009-10-22

Vuelta a Colombia
Colombia
Vuelta Colombia